Steven Zalewski (born August 20, 1986) is an American former professional ice hockey center. He most recently played with the Straubing Tigers of the Deutsche Eishockey Liga (DEL). Zalewski was drafted 153rd overall in the 2004 NHL Entry Draft by the San Jose Sharks.

Playing career
Zalewski played high school hockey for the NYS Section III Division 2, New Hartford Spartans and was named NYS Player of the year in 2002. Zalewski played college hockey for four years at Clarkson University, scoring 108 points in 151 games. Following a brief stint with the Worcester Sharks of the American Hockey League at the end of the 2007–08 season, Zalewski played 75 games for the team in 2008–09. He collected 13 goals and 26 assists in his first season of professional play. After scoring a goal in three games at the beginning of the 2009–10 AHL season, Zalewski made his NHL debut with the San Jose Sharks on October 12, 2009 against the Phoenix Coyotes.

Zalewski was traded along with Jay Leach to the New Jersey Devils for Patrick Davis and Mike Swift. During the 2011–12 season, Zalewski was recalled from AHL affiliate, the Albany Devils, and appeared in 7 games for New Jersey.

On July 18, 2013, Zalewski signed as a free agent to a one-year contract with Finnish club, Lukko of the Liiga, and the next year stayed in Liiga, signing a one-year contract for Ilves.

After two seasons in Finland, Zalewski continued his career abroad, moving to Germany in signing an initial one-year deal with the Straubing Tigers of the DEL on June 17, 2015, that was extended for another year in 2016.

He featured in international hockey for the first time in 2015, playing three games for the US National team in the Deutschland Cup in Germany. He was a late addition to the squad, replacing Auston Matthews after he was ruled out with a back injury.

Personal 
Two of Zalewski's brothers have played professionally, Rich played in the Southern Hockey League, and Mike who plays professional hockey for Kölner Haie in the DEL. His sister, Annika Zalewski, plays professionally with the PWHPA, having previously played for the Buffalo Beauts.

Career statistics

Awards and honors

References

External links

1986 births
Albany Devils players
American men's ice hockey centers
Clarkson Golden Knights men's ice hockey players
Clarkson University alumni
Ice hockey players from New York (state)
Ilves players
Living people
Lukko players
New Jersey Devils players
People from New Hartford, New York
San Jose Sharks draft picks
San Jose Sharks players
Sportspeople from Utica, New York
Straubing Tigers players
Worcester Sharks players